Telfordville is a hamlet in central Alberta, Canada within Leduc County. It is named for Robert Telford, former Leduc mayor and member of the Legislative Assembly of Alberta.

Demographics 

As a designated place in the 2016 Census of Population conducted by Statistics Canada, Telfordville had a population of 20 living in 11 of its 15 total private dwellings, compared to its 2011 population of 0.

See also 
List of communities in Alberta
List of hamlets in Alberta

References 

Designated places in Alberta
Hamlets in Alberta
Leduc County